Nick Bright is a British radio and television presenter. He currently hosts Saturday mid mornings on BBC Radio 1Xtra, The Squad on BBC Radio 5 Live, Sundays at midday, numerous different projects for BBC Sport and the Arsenal Matchday Show.

Early life
Born at Mayday Hospital in Croydon, his father is half Ghanaian and his mother is English. He grew up in South Norwood, London. He is a supporter of Arsenal F.C.

He was educated at St Joseph’s College in south London before his family relocated to Portsmouth where he attended St Luke's School. He went on to study music technology at South Downs College and then completed a degree in Radio Production at the University Of Westminster.

Career
In April 2010, Bright began presenting on BBC Radio 1Xtra launching a brand new early breakfast show (4am7am Monday to Saturday). Since then he moved to the Weekend Breakfast show (710am) and then to Saturdays and Sundays 10am1pm. In August 2018 he joined BBC Radio 5 Live presenting a show called The Squad on Sundays at midday. This meant he could no longer present his Sunday show on 1Xtra

Alongside his radio commitments, Bright also does some TV presenting hosting the FA People’s Cup for BBC Sport since 2015 and the 2017 World Cup Of Pool on Sky Sports. In summer 2018 he fronted a new World Cup chat show for BBC Sport called Barbershop Ballers in which he and his panel of guests discussed the days matches.

For the 2018/19 Premier League season he was confirmed as one of the presenters of the Arsenal Matchday Show called Arsenal Nation Live.

He had a brief stint as grime artist Lethal Bizzle’s tour DJ.

References

External links
Nick Bright (BBC Radio 1Xtra)

Living people
People from Croydon
Mass media people from Portsmouth
BBC Radio 1Xtra presenters
BBC Radio 5 Live presenters
Black British radio presenters
English radio DJs
English people of Ghanaian descent
Year of birth missing (living people)